Dendrobium taylorii, commonly known as the smooth burr orchid, is an epiphytic or lithophytic orchid in the family Orchidaceae and is endemic to tropical North Queensland, Australia. It has a single leathery, dark green leaf on a cylindrical stem and one or two small white flowers. Unlike other burr orchids, this species is insect-pollinated. It grows in rainforest, mangroves and sheltered forests.

Description 
Dendrobium taylorii is an epiphytic or lithophytic herb that usually forms small, dense clumps. The side lobes are oblong and the middle lobe is fleshy, turns downwards and is densely covered with hairs. Flowering occurs between November and May, the flowers insect-pollinated and remain open for many weeks.

Taxonomy and naming
The smooth burr orchid was first formally described in 1874 by Ferdinand von Mueller who gave it the name Bulbophyllum taylori. He published the description in Fragmenta phytographiae Australiae from a specimen collected near the Bloomfield River by Norman Taylor. In 1885 Frederick Manson Bailey changed the name to Dendrobium taylorii. The specific epithet (taylorii) honours the collector of the type specimen.

Distribution and habitat
Dendrobium taylorii grows on trees and rocks in rainforest, mangroves and sheltered forests between the Iron Range and Townsville in North Queensland, Australia.

References

taylorii
Orchids of Queensland
Plants described in 1874